The garden slender salamander (Batrachoseps major) is a species of salamander in the family Plethodontidae.  It is found in northern Baja California in Mexico and Southern California in the United States.

Distribution
The garden slender salamander's natural habitats, in the Transverse and Peninsular Ranges, are chaparral and woodlands, temperate coniferous forests, arable land, rural gardens, and urban areas.

This salamander eats worms of many types and crawling arthropods of lesser size, such as pill bugs.

Conservation
The garden slender salamander is threatened by habitat loss, it is an IUCN Red List Least concern monitored species.

One subspecies, the desert slender salamander (B. m. aridus, sometimes Batrachoseps aridus), is a federally listed endangered species of the United States.

References

External links
IUCN: all species searchpage

Batrachoseps
Salamander
Salamander
Fauna of the California chaparral and woodlands
Fauna of the Baja California Peninsula
Natural history of Baja California
Natural history of the Peninsular Ranges
Natural history of the Transverse Ranges
Amphibians described in 1915
Taxonomy articles created by Polbot